Tigrioides kobashayii is a moth in the family Erebidae. It was described by Hiroshi Inoue in 1961. It is found in Japan.

References

Moths described in 1961
Lithosiina